Jammu and Kashmir State Industrial Development Corporation Ltd (J&K SIDCO) is the agency of the Government of Jammu and Kashmir responsible for undertaking infrastructural development, trading activities and development banking. It was set up in 1969. It is engaged in development of infrastructure of industrial complexes and estates and growth centres, food processing zones and software technology parks.

References 

State agencies of Jammu and Kashmir
State industrial development corporations of India
1969 establishments in Jammu and Kashmir
Economy of Jammu and Kashmir